Tripeptidyl-peptidase may refer to:
 Tripeptidyl-peptidase I, an enzyme
 Tripeptidyl-peptidase II, an enzyme